Ballinrobe GAA is a Gaelic Athletic Association club based in the town of Ballinrobe in south County Mayo, Ireland. The club participates in competitions organized by Mayo county board of the Gaelic Athletic Association.

Achievements
 Mayo Senior Hurling Championship Winners (3) 1973, 1976, 1977

References

Gaelic football clubs in County Mayo
Gaelic games clubs in County Mayo